Delivrance may refer to:
 Délivrance, a studio album by A Hawk and a Hacksaw released in 2009
 La Délivrance, a 16-foot statue in bronze in Barnet, France

See also 
  Deliverance (disambiguation)

fr:Délivrance